The 2013 Vallenar earthquake was an earthquake that occurred near Vallenar, Chile on January 30, 2013, 20:15 (UTC). Depth was 45.0 km (28.0 mi), moment magnitude was 6.8. One person died of a heart attack.

See also 
 List of earthquakes in 2013
 List of earthquakes in Chile
 1922 Vallenar earthquake

References 

Earthquakes in Chile
2013 earthquakes
January 2013 events in South America
2013 in Chile
Presidency of Sebastián Piñera